The following is a list of characters that first appeared in the BBC soap opera EastEnders in 2003, by order of first appearance.

Eleanor Trueman 

Eleanor "Ellie" Trueman (real name Amber) is the result of a one-night stand between Paul Trueman (Gary Beadle) and a woman called Amy. Amy leaves the baby on Paul's doorstep and he struggles to cope as a single parent. He names the baby Eleanor, after the mother of his stepfather, Patrick Trueman (Rudolph Walker). As Paul starts to cope with looking after Eleanor, Amy decides she wants her back, and Social Services collect her, leaving Paul heartbroken.

Dominic Price

Detective Inspector Dominic Price, played by Paul Brennen, is first seen in March 2003, while his colleague, PC Kate Morton (Jill Halfpenny) is undercover as a honeytrap on Phil Mitchell (Steve McFadden), investigating the disappearance of Lisa Fowler (Lucy Benjamin), mother of Phil's daughter Louise Mitchell (Rachel Cox).

He mainly helps Kate with initial searches of the Mitchell house, constantly reminding her that "the boss" wants to nail Phil. He later starts to suspect that Kate is developing feelings for Phil, and reminds her that Phil could be a murderer. Kate gives Phil an ultimatum: to tell the truth about Lisa's whereabouts or she will finish with him. After Phil calls her bluff and finishes with her, Price takes Kate off the case, however, after Phil phones her and says he will tell her everything, she is congratulated by "the boss" – DCI Jill Marsden (Sophie Stanton) – who has wanted to convict Phil since 2001.

Kate goes to the Mitchell's house wearing a wire, and hears Phil's confession that he had mentally abused Lisa into handing over Louise, leaving her in Portugal. After this, Kate takes off her wire, telling Price and Marsden that she has fallen in love with Phil. They stick around outside, hoping that Kate has changed tactic and is still on their side, but they cannot hear what is happening as the wire has broken, so Marsden calls Kate's mobile phone, which leads to Phil discovering the wire. After a heated argument, Price and Marsden storm into the house to find Phil with his hand around Kate's throat. She refuses to press charges so they cannot arrest him, and they have to leave, deflated.

Price appears again in May 2003 when Kate returns to work and is asked to choose between her job and Phil. She chooses to resign, and asks Price for one last favour as a leaving present: to get George Peters (Andy Beckwith) arrested for dealing cocaine. George is a heavy employed by Jack Dalton (Hywel Bennett), who had been sent to rape Kate.

Price and Marsden later appear in November 2003, when Den Watts (Leslie Grantham) and his son Dennis Rickman (Nigel Harman) set Phil up for armed robbery; this time they are successful in convicting him, keeping him in custody until his case collapses in 2005. In late 2004, an off-duty Price visits Kate, now running a salon, and she tells him she is bored of her career. He finds her another job in the police, based in Brighton, which causes her to leave Walford the next day.

Dennis Rickman

Dennis Rickman, played by Nigel Harman, is introduced as the hardman successor to the character of Steve Owen (Martin Kemp), who was killed off in the series in 2002. Dennis makes his first appearance on 14 April 2003. His storylines involve his difficult past and childhood, relationship with his infamous father, Den Watts (Leslie Grantham), clashes with the rival Mitchell family, and a forbidden romance with his adopted sister, Sharon Watts (Letitia Dean). He is described as the show's "bad boy pin-up character." In 2005, Harman quit the show alongside co-star Dean, and makes his last appearance on 30 December 2005.

Mickey Miller

Mickey Miller, played by Joe Swash, makes his first appearance on 15 April 2003. Introduced as a guest character, Mickey proved popular and was turned into a regular by executive producer Louise Berridge. The character is portrayed as a wheeler-dealer, involved in various money-making scams. A family is built around the character in 2004 when the other Millers move to Albert Square. It was announced on 25 February 2008 that the characters of Mickey and his stepfather Keith (David Spinx) had been axed by EastEnders' executive producer Diederick Santer. Mickey leaves on 1 July 2008. In July 2011, it was announced Swash would reprise his role for the departure storyline of his screen brother Darren (Charlie G. Hawkins). He appears for two episodes on 19 and 20 September 2011.

Shirley Benson

Shirley Benson is played by Robyn Moore. The character was axed in 2004.

Shirley is initially seen in Albert Square in May 2003. A divorcée, she has three sons, now grown up; two are in the army and the other lives in New Zealand. She works at the Walford Bookies and lives with her cat, Boots, at 89a George Street.

Dan Ferreira (Dalip Tahil) needs a date for an upcoming wedding, so he asks Shirley and she agrees. Dan tells Shirley that his wife, Pushpa (Madhur Jaffrey), is dead, when they have only separated, following Pushpa's infidelity. At the wedding, everyone is enjoying the day until Pushpa introduces herself to Shirley. She is mortified to discover Dan's lies, telling him that her ex-husband was a liar and she is not prepared to put up with lying again. She also tells Dan that she wants nothing more to do with him.

In August that year, Shirley has problems with her new neighbour, Gavin Sharp (Steve Nicolson). He lives in the flat above hers and plays extremely loud music at all hours, meaning Shirley cannot sleep. She tries reasoning with him several times but he laughs at her, only playing his music louder, so she complains to the council. Maddened, Gavin threatens to make her life a misery as payback. Days later, Shirley's cat disappears and Shirley fears that Gavin is responsible. Whilst Dan confronts Gavin about Boots, Little Mo (Kacey Ainsworth) walks into The Queen Victoria pub, cuddling Boots. Shirley rewards her with money but later that day, Shirley finds Boots on her doorstep – dead in a plastic bin bag. Shirley turns to the Ferreiras for help, and Dan confronts Gavin again. Gavin denies killing Boots and says that he found her lying dead in the road and left her on Shirley's doorstep so she could bury her. Shirley, however, is not convinced. Gavin's taunting continues when he puts her telephone number on a card, advertising her as a prostitute, and distributes it across Walford. Later, while she is at work, Gavin breaks into her flat and tips rotten rubbish all over the floor. Shirley is distraught, and seeing her angst, Ash Ferreira (Raji James), decides to help. He plays Gavin at his own game, borrowing his brother's amplifier and speakers and playing dance music extremely loudly. He then breaks into Gavin's flat and lets a rat loose. Gavin is petrified of rats and when he discovers it, he agrees to call a truce if they remove it.

The saga brings Ash and Shirley closer together and it is not long before they start a relationship. Ash wants to keep it a secret because he knows his father will be furious if he finds out. Shirley begins to get irritated with Ash's inability to tell Dan, particularly when Dan tries to woo Shirley for a second time. Ash explains that he had been a compulsive gambler, and Dan had bailed him out of serious financial difficulties after he lost his house and his wife. He owes his father everything and is unwilling to hurt him. However, when Dan tries kissing Shirley she told him that she is with his son, Ash. This revelation causes huge rows at the Ferreiras' and although Ash loves Shirley, he feels he has no choice but to finish with her to keep the peace.

In February 2004, Andy Hunter (Michael Higgs) takes over the bookies where Shirley works. Shirley does not like the way Andy runs things and after she complains repeatedly about his conduct, Andy fires her. Shirley demonstrates about her unfair dismissal with a placard outside the bookies. Eventually Andy offers her a large sum of money to leave. Shirley is thrilled with the pay-off and decides to go to New Zealand to visit her son.

Jack Dalton

Jack Dalton, played by Hywel Bennett, is a gangland boss and the leader of the criminal organisation known as "The Firm". He first appears in EastEnders in May 2003, although the events surrounding the apparent death of the character Den Watts (Leslie Grantham), who was supposedly murdered in February 1989 were then retconned to include him. Dalton was a fearsome and legendary kingpin of the Walford criminal underworld. In addition to this and his status as head of The Firm, Dalton was responsible for ordering Den's death 14 years earlier.

In the late 1980s, Den became involved with "Walford Investments", aka The Firm, and was forced to become the titular manager of Strokes wine bar (formerly Henry's), which was owned by The Firm and was really a front for illegal gambling. Strokes had a rival bar in the form of The Dagmar, fronted by James Willmott-Brown (William Boyde), who went on to rape his employee Kathy Beale (Gillian Taylforth) - the wife of Den's best friend Pete (Peter Dean). In response to this, Den used his connections with The Firm to arrange for The Dagmar to be torched. The fire drew attention to the illegal goings-on at Strokes, and thus greatly angered The Firm. Den refused to take the blame and The Firm believed that he had informed the police about them. Consequently, Dalton decided to have Den murdered, and two of their members followed him to Manchester in September 1988 when he went there to seek refuge with a friend. However, he managed to outrun them in his friend's car and handed himself into the police; Den was then held under remand in custody on an arson charge until he appeared in court the following February.

In one of the series' most famous exits, Den - who just hours earlier had escaped after members of The Firm had intercepted the taxi taking him to court - was shot as he walked by the canal by a member of The Firm, who was walking with a woman and had a gun hidden in a bunch of daffodils. Three weeks later, spots of blood were found on the canal towpath and the police identified this as Den's blood, and believed that he had been murdered. However, an initial search of the canal failed to uncover his body. In April 1990, Billy (Danny Brown), a local boy was fishing in the canal when he discovered Den's distinctive signet ring, prompting another search of the canal which this time uncovered a body which was identified as Den's.

In 2003, it is revealed that Den had indeed been shot - but the shot had only wounded him. Aided by his mistress Jan Hammond (Jane How), he was able to escape to Spain where he forged a new life. Den finally returns to Walford on 29 September 2003. The body which had been found, wrongly-identified and buried had actually been the body of the unseen Mr. Vinnicombe, who was said to have been Dalton's predecessor as head of the Firm during the 1980s. Dalton had been displeased with Vinnicombe's failure to murder Den, and so ordered a member of The Firm to kill him and dump his body in the canal at the location where Den had been shot - his teeth were then bricked out to prevent dental identification; this implied a power struggle for control of "The Firm" at the time between Dalton and Vinnicombe. He also dumped Den's distinctive ring in the canal to further increase the likelihood of the body being identified as that of Den. Upon Vinnicombe's demise, Dalton was able to gain firm control of the organisation.

During his brief spell on screen, Dalton shows a Machiavellian and ruthless streak. This is first evident when he first appears onscreen at his nightclub, the "Imperial Room", and receives a visit from Phil Mitchell (Steve McFadden) – the local hardman of Albert Square, a community from East London and it's fictionalized borough: Walford. Following Phil's visit, Dalton arranges for one of his neighbours Spencer Moon (Christopher Parker) to get beaten up for using forged currency in his club though Spencer's brother Alfie (Shane Richie) takes the beating by pretending to be Spencer. Later on, Dalton discovers that his personal secretary Kate Morton (Jill Halfpenny) is actually a policewoman working undercover at his nightclub. In response, he summons his bouncer George Peters (Andy Beckwith) with the task of killing Kate by raping and murdering her in the latter's house. This is nearly successful until Phil, who previously had a one-night stand with Kate, comes to her rescue by knocking out Peters. The two men later return to Dalton, who blames Peters for failure and confronts Phil over his relationship with Kate. Though he is eventually persuaded by Phil to let Kate live scot-free, Dalton tells Phil that he now owes him a favor.

At somepoint, Dalton receives a visit from Phil's love rival: Dennis Rickman (Nigel Harman). It soon transpires that Dennis is Dalton's most dedicated employee, having been taken under Dalton's wing since he was 16-years-old. Moreover, Dennis had recently served 18 months in prison for covering up Dalton's criminal activities without exposing his involvement. Dennis soon begins to blackmail Dalton for £20,000 in compensation for serving his prison sentence for him. After giving Dennis his £20,000 compensation, Dalton plans to have him killed and summons Phil to carry out the task by reminding him of the favor he owes him. When Phil goes to kill Dennis, however, he ends up changing his mind when Dennis offers to kill Dalton himself - so the two of them will be free of him. Using the gun that Dalton originally gave Phil to kill him, Dennis confronts Dalton at his nightclub and forces him to drive Phil's car into the woods - where Dalton is ordered to park the edge of a railway track. Dalton is initially unfazed with Dennis' attempt to kill him and attempts to brainwash him in teaming up against Phil, with Dalton going as far as to recount all the things they've done together. When Dennis mentions Den and his family, pointing out that his future with Den's adopted daughter Sharon (Letitia Dean) is what matters to him now, Dalton begins to badmouth Sharon and her family before admitting to have arranged for Den to be killed. However, Dalton's mood changes from composure to fear when Dennis makes a confession: that Sharon's father is actually his father as well. Confirming that Den is his father, Dennis continues to point the gun at Dalton - who desperately attempts to reason with Dennis by revealing the truth about Den Watts; that he is in fact alive. Dalton begs Dennis that this "has to make a difference" in the hope that he will not shoot him, but Dennis tells him that it doesn't and - before Dalton can react - proceeds to shoot him, killing Dalton.

Dalton appears to be somewhat nihilistic. When Dennis tells Dalton that he wants a new life away from a life of crime, Dalton responds "There isn't any new life! Just the old humdrum life bobbing along, making a living, getting old, waiting to die." nonchalantly, echoing Dot Branning's (June Brown) words when she is depressed.

Dalton's death would later be avenged at the end of 2005 when Dennis is murdered by Danny Moon (Jake Maskall) on the orders of his crime boss Johnny Allen (Billy Murray), who himself had killed Dalton's representative Andy Hunter (Michael Higgs) nearly a year before; ironically, Andy died on the same night Den was ultimately killed by his wife Chrissie (Tracy Ann Oberman). Alas, Dalton's legacy ultimately ends with Phil and his younger brother Grant (Ross Kemp) seeking to avenge Dennis' murder on Sharon's behalf - which culminates in Danny getting killed by his brother Jake (Joel Beckett), while Johnny later dies of a heart attack after being imprisoned for the murders of both Andy and Dennis respectively.

Dan Ferreira

Dan Ferreira, played by Dalip Tahil, is the head of the Ferreira family, and father to Ash (Raji James), Adi (Ameet Chana), Ronny (Ray Panthaki) and Kareena (Pooja Shah). When he first arrives in Albert Square, he claims to be a widower, talking about his wife, Pushpa (Madhur Jaffrey) as being dead, both to the neighbours and his children, but they have merely separated after she had an affair. Dan disappears suddenly and clears out the family's bank account, and it is later revealed that Tariq Larousi (Nabil Elouahabi) is his illegitimate son.

Ash Ferreira

Ash Ferreira, played by Raji James, is the eldest son of Dan (Dalip Tahil) and brother of Adi (Ameet Chana), Ronny (Ray Panthaki) and Kareena (Pooja Shah). He is the intelligent member of the family, the standard of his education being much higher than his siblings, so much so that he is a lecturer. He has an on/off problem with gambling. He has a relationship with Shirley Benson (Robyn Moore), but it ends when his father finds out.

Adi Ferreira

Adi Ferreira, played by Ameet Chana, is the brother of Ash (Raji James), Ronny (Ray Panthaki) and Kareena (Pooja Shah). Adi runs a clothes stall on the market with his sister, and spends a lot of time trying to impress his father, Dan (Dalip Tahil) but fails. He has a romance with Sasha Perkins (Jemma Walker), a pole dancer and escort, who he initially pays to pretend to be his girlfriend. However she has an affair with Danny Moon (Jake Maskall) which ends the relationship.

Ronny Ferreira

Ronny Ferreira, played by Ray Panthaki, is the brother of Ash (Raji James), Adi (Ameet Chana) and Kareena (Pooja Shah). Ronny is a DJ, and has brief relationships with Kelly Taylor (Brooke Kinsella) and Zoe Slater (Michelle Ryan). He is stabbed by a gang while trying to protect his friend Tariq Larousi (Nabil Elouahabi), and needs to have a kidney transplant. When none of his family are a tissue match, Tariq reveals that he is Ronny's half-brother, and he donates a kidney to him.

Kareena Ferreira

Kareena Ferreira, played by Pooja Shah, is the daughter of Dan Ferreira (Dalip Tahil) and sister of Ash (Raji James), Adi (Ameet Chana) and Ronny (Ray Panthaki). Kareena is in a secret relationship with Tariq Larousi (Nabil Elouahabi), though it is not a sexual one. This is not discovered by the Ferreira family until after they break up. It later transpires that Tariq is Kareena's half-brother. She has a relationship with Mickey Miller (Joe Swash), but problems arise when Juley Smith (Joseph Kpobie) gives Kareena cocaine and she is seduced by him.

Tariq Larousi

Tariq Larousi, played by Nabil Elouahabi, is a friend of Ronny Ferreira (Ray Panthaki), and is disliked by Ronny's father, Dan Ferreira (Dalip Tahil). It transpires that Tariq is in a secret relationship with Ronny's sister Kareena Ferreira (Pooja Shah), but the Ferreira family discover this after they split up. Ronny is stabbed by a gang while trying to protect Tariq, and needs to have a kidney transplant. When none of his family are a tissue match, Tariq reveals that he is Dan's son, and therefore Ronny's half-brother. Tariq then donates a kidney to him.

Pushpa Ferreira

Pushpa Ferreira, played by Madhur Jaffrey, is the mother of Ash (Ameet Chana), Adi (Ameet Chana), Ronny (Ray Panthaki) and Kareena (Pooja Shah). She is separated from her husband Dan Ferreira| (Dalip Tahil) after she had an affair with his best friend, with whom she moved in with. Dan claims to Shirley Benson (Robyn Moore) that Pushpa is dead, but his lie is uncovered when she arrives at a wedding and introduces herself to Shirley.

Tony Jamison

Tony Jamison, played by Ben Cartwright, is the ex-partner-in-crime of Dennis Rickman (Nigel Harman), and used to work with Dennis for their gangland boss Jack Dalton (Hywel Bennett) - which led to Dennis serving an 18-month prison sentence for Dalton.

A broke Tony visits Dennis in 2003 asking for money. He persuades Dennis to ask Dalton for a loan on his behalf. This provokes Dalton to order Dennis' love rival, Phil Mitchell (Steve McFadden), to kill him at the "Angie's Den" nightclub. However, Dennis persuades Phil to let him kill Dalton - which he does in a nearby forest. Tony has not seen or heard from after this.

Andy Hunter

Andy Hunter, played by Michael Higgs, is a mobster who originally as representative of The Firm - though he later takes control of the organization following the murder of its leader and his gangland boss, Jack Dalton (Hywel Bennett). From then onwards, Andy becomes the show's main antagonist up until his departure from the series on 18 February 2005. He has a relationship with local resident Kat Slater (Jessie Wallace), but she leaves him at their wedding ceremony to be with his love rival - Alfie Moon (Shane Richie). He later goes on to marry Kat's best-friend Sam Mitchell (Kim Medcalf). She ends up signing her house and assets over to Andy and he then dumps her afterwards, leaving Sam with nothing. Andy also orders the murder of Alfie's neighbour Paul Trueman (Gary Beadle), after Paul - who had been working for Andy – reported him to the police for his criminal activities. Andy's luck finally runs out, however, when he tries to con fellow mob boss Johnny Allen (Billy Murray) – who consequently usurps Andy from his position as the crime kingpin of Walford. After Johnny learns of his plan to defraud him, he forges a meet-up between him and Andy at a motorway flyover. There, Johnny kills Andy by forcing him off the bridge – causing Andy to fall to his death.

Ironically, Andy died on the same night that his frenemy Den Watts (Leslie Grantham) is murdered by his wife Chrissie (Tracy Ann Oberman). Soon afterwards, Andy's death is discovered by his friend and Dalton's killer Dennis Rickman (Nigel Harman) – which prompts Johnny to have him assassinated by his employee Danny Moon (Jake Maskall). Eventually, Andy's death is avenged when Sam's brothers Phil (Steve McFadden) and Grant (Ross Kemp) resolve to help their lover Sharon (Letitia Dean) bring Johnny to justice for Dennis' murder – as she and Dennis were married and adopted half-siblings; this culminates with Danny being shot dead by his brother Jake (Joel Beckett), while Johnny later dies of a heart attack amid serving life imprisonment for the murders of Andy and Dennis respectively.

Sasha Perkins

Sasha Perkins is played by Jemma Walker.

She is initially shown as Adi Ferreira's (Ameet Chana) escort friend in 2003, whom he hires to pretend to be his girlfriend at a wedding to impress his father, Dan (Dalip Tahil). Originally a guest character, executive producer Louise Berridge opted to bring her back the following year, offering actress Jemma Walker a 6-month contract. Walker commented in 2004, "I think she's a bit of light relief around the place [...] Sasha called herself an 'escort', but I think she was actually on the game. But she doesn't have any issues with it. You do what you have to do to survive." Sasha was reportedly brought in to spice up the Asian Ferreira family, who were heavily criticised in the British media.

Sasha begins a relationship with Adi and moves in with him, bringing her pet snake called Lionel. Walker has commented, "Adi's shy and hasn't had much experience with the ladies. Sasha's had enough [bastards] mess her around and now she wants someone to settle down with."

Sasha joins the Ferreira family mini-cab firm – they name the company Toucan Cars after her toucan slippers. She eventually realises that Adi is not right for her; she has an affair with Danny Moon (Jake Maskall) and then ends the relationship. Following this she has sex with Billy Mitchell (Perry Fenwick) before leaving Walford. The character was one of many to be axed by executive producer Kathleen Hutchison following a media backlash and falling ratings surrounding the soap.

Bobby Beale

Bobby Beale is played by Clay Milner Russell. Bobby is the son of Ian and Laura Beale (Adam Woodyatt and Hannah Waterman). Kevin Curran played Bobby from 2003 to 2007, and was replaced by Alex Francis on 7 May 2007. Francis was not credited in the role until 10 March 2008. In January 2013 it was announced that Bobby had been recast, with Rory Stroud taking over the role. Stroud first appeared as Bobby on 1 March 2013. His character departed from the show in May, before returning in November, with Eliot Carrington taking over the role.

Jonathan Leroy

Doctor Jonathan Leroy, played by Ivan Kaye, is first seen with his unnamed wife as Phil Mitchell's (Steve McFadden) unwelcome tenants that have been fraudulently rented Phil's house by his nanny Joanne Ryan (Tara Lynne O'Neill), as an act of revenge for him spurning her advances. Dr. Leroy continues as a recurrent character in the role of new doctor for Albert Square until he is replaced by Oliver Cousins (Tom Ellis). His wife is not seen after her first appearance in 2003. Leroy is also a member of the Queen Vic's ill-fated pub football team Real Walford.

Gavin Sharp

Gavin Sharp, played by Steve Nicolson, is Shirley Benson's (Robyn Moore) neighbour from hell. He is first seen in Walford in August 2003 when he moves into 89b George street, which is the flat above Shirley's. He works in the Walford video shop.

As soon as he moves in, Gavin starts causing problems for Shirley, by playing his music extremely loudly at all hours of the day and night. After a while, Shirley pleads with him to stop being so inconsiderate, but this only makes him play his music louder. Eventually, Shirley reports him to the landlord, and then to council. After Gavin is visited from a council representative, he vows to make Shirley's life a misery. Days later, Shirley's cat, Boots, goes missing, and she fears that Gavin may be responsible. After several weeks, the cat is found dead in a plastic bin bag on Shirley's doorstep. A distraught Shirley turns to her friends, the Ferreira family, for help, but Gavin claims that he found the cat dead in the road and returned it to Shirley as an act of kindness. Shirley is not convinced.

Gavin continues to make Shirley's life hell by putting her telephone number on a call-girl card and posting them around Walford. He later breaks into her flat and tips rubbish all over her floor. Ash Ferreira (Raji James) decides to step in and play him at his own game. He borrows his brother's speakers and plays dance music extremely loudly, which maddens Gavin and he reports them to the landlord. Shirley and Ash are ready for this, and upon the landlord's visit, they play classical music and pretended they are involved in a book club. This satisfies the landlord and leaves Gavin looking like a fool. He threatens both Shirley and Ash, and makes regular racist comments whenever any of the Ferreiras are around. A few days later, Ash overhears an altercation between Gavin and the road sweeper Gus Smith (Mohammed George). Gavin is unhappy about the uncleanliness of the Square, particularly as it could attract rats. Sensing Gavin's fear of rats, Ash and family convince Gus to trap a rat in the Square, and with the help of Tariq Larousi (Nabil Elouahabi), he breaks into Gavin's flat and sets the rat free. The plan works and Gavin is petrified. He promises to call a truce with Shirley if they remove the rat.

However, Gavin decides to perform one last malicious act as payback. He sabotages the Ferreiras clothing stock with paint. When the Ferreiras attempt to reclaim for the damages on their insurance, they are furious to learn that Adi (Ameet Chana) had forgotten to renew it. Gavin's last appearance is in October 2003.

Geoff Morton 

Detective Chief Inspector Geoff Morton, played by Maurice Roëves, is the alcoholic father of Kate Morton (Jill Halfpenny), who arrives for her wedding to Phil Mitchell (Steve McFadden). He is not impressed on Phil's stag night, when Minty Peterson (Cliff Parisi) tells him about Phil's immigrant ex-wife Nadia (Anna Barkan). He is also disappointed that Phil does not drink, and accepts the dare of drinking a yard of ale, before being thrown out of The Queen Victoria pub for insulting Nana Moon (Hilda Braid). He then goes to Angie's Den where he insults Little Mo Mitchell (Kacey Ainsworth) and is hit by her husband, Billy (Perry Fenwick). He later refuses to attend Kate and Phil's wedding, but has a conversation with Phil about alcoholism and returns to Newcastle to seek help. However, in March 2004 Kate hears the news that Geoff has committed suicide.

Yolande Trueman

Yolande Trueman, played by Angela Wynter, arrives in Albert Square as Patrick Trueman's (Rudolph Walker) holiday romance. They eventually settle down and marry in 2004. She strikes up a feud with Pat Evans (Pam St Clement), which worsens when she discovers that Pat has been having an affair with Patrick. In 2008 Yolande is offered a new job at the Minute Mart HQ in Birmingham. She accepts with delight and busily prepares for the move, however Patrick is less keen. This leads to Yolande surprising everyone at her leaving party by announcing that she is leaving Walford alone. She returned for one episode on 20 March 2017.

Graham Foster

Graham Foster, played by Alex McSweeney, first appears as a customer in The Queen Victoria public house and befriends barmaid Little Mo Mitchell (Kacey Ainsworth). They become friends after discovering they both love crosswords and Graham gives Little Mo a pen to use when she does them. He also buys her a rose when a flower salesman is in the pub.

One night in pub when he and Little Mo are alone, Graham refuses to leave until the song that is playing on the jukebox ends (Little Mo does not know he has put the song on repeat). Graham eventually makes his intentions towards Little Mo clear by trying to kiss her. She tries to flee, but Graham chases her and rapes her on the pub floor. This results in her conceiving their son Freddie.

Little Mo's father, Charlie Slater (Derek Martin) subsequently assaults Graham, resulting in three months imprisonment and a suspension of his taxi license. Graham then sues Charlie for compensation, which is paid by Little Mo's sister Kat Moon (Jessie Wallace) and her husband, Alfie (Shane Richie). They offer and Graham accepts £10,000, which they have borrowed from Andy Hunter (Michael Higgs). Graham claiming this money however, does come before a warning from Kat to "not spend a penny" of the money for his legal fees, while also explaining what prison will be like for him. Alfie tries to stop her from making this speech, only for her to tell Alfie that it must be said.
 
On 5 November 2004, Graham appears before magistrates. After Little Mo gives her summary of events and her husband Billy (Perry Fenwick) defends her in his testimony, the court takes a recess. It is during this that Graham's mother Deirdre (Patricia Brake) approached Little Mo and Freddie and reveals that Graham has two daughters, Ella and Rebecca, from his failed marriage who he never sees. When Little Mo witnesses Graham verbally abusing Deirdre, she feels sorry for her while explaining that it reminds her of how her late husband Trevor Morgan (Alex Ferns) spoke to her. Once back in the courtroom, Graham lies under oath claiming that he sees his other children often, only for Little Mo's barrister to reveal it has been over three years since he last had. With this Graham gets into a rage from the dock, shouting at his mother knowing that she has informed Little Mo of this. He is eventually sentenced to eight years in prison. Little Mo gives Deirdre her address and asks her to remain in contact.

Graham last appears in January 2005 when Billy goes to visit him in prison after receiving a visiting order, which he requested. Graham goads Billy about not being Freddie's real father and points out Freddie has siblings, two sisters. He tells Billy that Freddie will probably look like him, and he is looking forward to seeing him when he is released in four years time, although has never made another appearance in the square.

Victor Duke

Victor Duke, played by Ben Thomas, is the husband of Yolande Duke (Angela Wynter), who arrives in Walford when his wife has run away to live with Patrick Trueman (Rudolph Walker). He offers Patrick £10,000 to leave Yolande, then tells Yolande that Patrick asked for money to finish with her, and when she sees Patrick with the money Victor tried to tempt him with, she takes the money and leaves, saying she does not want to be with either of them. After Victor returns to Trinidad, Yolande returns to Walford with the money, to share it with Patrick. Yolande later divorces Victor.

Mary Harkinson

Mary Harkinson, played by Mary Woodvine, is the estranged daughter of Derek Harkinson (Ian Lavender). She has not seen her father since he walked out on her mother, Cynthia, to live with another man, Robert (Paul Antony-Barber). When Derek's friend Pauline Fowler (Wendy Richard) finds out that Derek had children, she contacts Mary without telling Derek. Mary initially agrees to meet with Derek, but shuts the door in his face when he arrives at her house. Derek eventually persuades Mary to see him, and they meet, along with Mary's brother Alex (Ben Nealon) and his son Danny (Josh Alexander). Derek later leaves Walford to live with Mary after a string of arguments with Pauline.

Edwin Caldecott

Edwin Caldecott, played by Ron Moody, is a nemesis of Jim Branning (John Bardon), from his days as a boxer. Edwin goads Jim into one final match, which his wife Dot Branning (June Brown) and granddaughter Sonia Jackson (Natalie Cassidy) advise him against. On the day of the match, Jim is geared up to fight Edwin, but when Dot appears at the community centre, Jim is distracted and Edwin takes the advantage to get first the punch in, knocking Jim flat. Dot decides to let Jim think he won afterwards.

In 2017, Inside Soap said that Edwin's storyline was "a bit of light-hearted fun in the drama-packed run up to EastEnders Christmas" and said it was "nice" to see Moody in action.

Alex Harkinson

Alex Harkinson, played by Ben Nealon, is the estranged son of Derek Harkinson (Ian Lavender). He has not seen his father since he walked out on his mother, Cynthia, to live with another man, Robert (Paul Antony-Barber), when Alex was eight years old. When Derek's friend Pauline Fowler (Wendy Richard) goes to Alex's house to speak to him. Alex, not knowing that his father is gay, assumes that Pauline is the woman for whom Derek had left Cynthia, and tells her to leave. Alex's sister Mary (Mary Woodvine) later visits Derek on Boxing Day 2003, and is followed by Alex, who berates her and argues with Derek, but later relents and introduces him to his son, Danny (Josh Alexander).

Danny Harkinson

Danny Harkinson, played by Josh Alexander, is the son of Derek Harkinson's (Ian Lavender) estranged son Alex (Ben Nealon). He has never met his grandfather until Alex and Derek reconcile on Boxing Day 2003, and Alex introduces him to Derek.

Maxwell Moon

Maxwell Moon, played by Andrew Paul, is the second cousin of Alfie Moon (Shane Richie), who he visits on 5 December 2003. He enjoys a day of drinking and reminiscing about old times, but is offended when he realises Alfie has only invited him round to ask him a favour. Alfie wants a snow machine for his wedding to Kat Slater (Jessie Wallace), and he knows Maxwell could get him one, as he works in the film business. Maxwell rips up his wedding invite, but Kat charms him into coming to the wedding, while Alfie mends the invitation. Maxwell later attends the wedding on Christmas Day and provides a snow machine.

Maxwell has not been seen since. However, in 2005, Alfie's brother, Spencer (Christopher Parker) gets into trouble with the police, and he is sent to live with Maxwell in Australia.

Liza Moon

Liza Moon, played by Joanne Adams, is the estranged wife of Alfie Moon (Shane Richie). She has not seen Alfie since he was sent to prison for credit card fraud, but Alfie visits her when he wants a divorce so he can marry Kat Slater (Jessie Wallace). Liza does not want a divorce but gives up on a reconciliation with Alfie when she realises he loves Kat, not her. She then agrees to a divorce and Alfie marries Kat on Christmas Day 2003.

Tony Macrae 

Tony Macrae, played by Tam White, is a local who lives near the Scottish hotel where Barry Evans (Shaun Williamson) and Janine Butcher (Charlie Brooks) are married. He acts as one of the witnesses, alongside Paul Trueman (Gary Beadle), to Barry and Janine's quiet wedding in the hotel.

When Janine pushes Barry into a ravine, Tony joins the search party to look for Barry, and eventually finds his body in the ravine.

Others

References

External links

2003
, EastEnders
2003 in British television